Spilarctia comma is a moth in the family Erebidae. It was described by Francis Walker in 1856. It is found in Tibet in China and in Bhutan.

Subspecies
Spilarctia comma comma (Tibet)
Spilarctia comma wittmeri (Toulgoët, 1975) (Bhutan)

References

Moths described in 1856
comma